Broadbeach Australian Football Club, also known as the Broadbeach Cats, is an Australian rules football club representing the suburb of Broadbeach on the Gold Coast.  The club competes in the Queensland Australian Football League after having previously competed in North East Australian Football League. Its home ground is Subaru Oval – Nee Merrimac Oval. In the club's inaugural year in the QAFL the cats finished 4th but eliminated in the first round of the finals.

The senior level won its first premiership in 1987 under coach Wayne Ling And captain Brian Rowe. The highest point of the club's history was in 1996 when the club won 3 of the Grades, Colts, Seconds and Firsts.

Despite having been in existence since 1971, the Broadbeach Football Club has only competed at the top AFLQ level since 1997.

In 2005, the Cats were one of eight inaugural members of Queensland football's new first Division set-up, and they once again reached the finals.

In 2011, the club was granted permission to enter the NEAFL.

In 2019 Beau Zorko took over as senior coach after life member, and premiership captain 1996 Brett Andrews resigned at the end of 2018 due to family commitments. In February 2020 the club announced the resignation of Beau Zorko, being replaced by Craig O’Brien as senior coach, growing tensions between the two.

Competitions
1971-1996 Gold Coast Australian Football League
1997-2010, 2014- Queensland Australian Football League
2011-2013 North East Australian Football League

Premierships (3)

Grogan Medallists
David Round – 2005
Blake Erickson – 2018
Jordan Moncrieff – 2021

AFL Drafted Players

Theme song 
The theme song of the Broadbeach Cats uses the melody of the Battle Hymn of the Republic.

Broadbeach Cats are leaders in the game of Aussie rules,

Broadbeach Cats are leaders in the game of Aussie rules,

Anyone who doubts us is a bunch of bloody fools

As the Cats go marching on!

Glory, glory up the Broadbeach!

Glory, glory up the Broadbeach!

Glory, glory up the Broadbeach!

As the Cats go marching on!

References

External links

Broadbeach
1971 establishments in Australia
Australian rules football clubs established in 1971
Broadbeach, Queensland
Australian rules football teams on the Gold Coast, Queensland